Live at Montreux 1996 is a live album and DVD by British hard rock band Deep Purple, recorded in 1996 and released in 2006.

The CD and DVD release features live performances from Montreux in 1996 and 2000.

CD track listing
All songs written by Ritchie Blackmore, Ian Gillan, Roger Glover, Jon Lord, and Ian Paice except where noted.
"Fireball" – 3:50
"Ted the Mechanic" (Gillan, Steve Morse, Glover, Lord, Paice) – 4:27
"Pictures of Home" – 5:41
"Black Night" – 6:43
"Woman from Tokyo" – 5:21
"No One Came" – 5:06
"When a Blind Man Cries" – 7:29
Credited to Gillan, Morse, Glover, Lord and Paice on this release
"Hey Cisco" (Gillan, Morse, Glover, Lord, Paice) – 5:47
"Speed King" – 5:10
"Smoke on the Water" – 8:15

Bonus Tracks
Recorded at the Montreux Jazz Festival, Montreux, Switzerland; 22 July 2000
"Sometimes I Feel Like Screaming" (Gillan, Morse, Glover, Lord, Paice) – 6:46
"Fools" – 9:41

DVD track listing

Montreux – July 1996
"Fireball"
"Ted the Mechanic"
"Pictures of Home"
"Black Night"
"Cascades: I'm Not Your Lover"
"Woman from Tokyo"
"No One Came"
"When a Blind Man Cries"
"Hey Cisco"
"Speed King"
"Smoke on the Water"

Montreux – July 2000
"'69"
"Perfect Strangers"
"When a Blind Man Cries"
"Lazy"
"Highway Star"

Personnel
Ian Gillan – vocals
Steve Morse – guitar
Roger Glover – bass
Jon Lord – keyboards
Ian Paice – drums

Charts

Certifications [DVD]

References

Albums recorded at the Montreux Jazz Festival
2006 live albums
2006 video albums
Live video albums
Deep Purple video albums
Deep Purple live albums